Esther Jones may refer to: 

Esther Jones (athlete) (born 1969), Olympic gold medal-winning sprinter
Esther Jones, a singer who performed under the stage name Baby Esther
Esther Jones (singer) (1945–2006), member of the Ikettes